Al-Dafi archaeological site is a site that may be found near the eastern Saudi Arabian city of Jubail. The location was established around the second century BC. The location was found during the time (1404 AH - 1408 AH).

Label and location 
The name of the bay with shallow water that lies between the western coast of Al-Khursaniyah and the islands of Abu Ali and Al-Batinah is where the name of the Al-Dafi site originates. Since the location is situated on property owned by the Royal Commission for Jubail and Yanbu and is in Jubail Industrial City, it is also known as Doha Al-Dafi. Particularly, the property is situated among the Jubail Industrial College's residences, which are north of the city of Jubail. According to Lorimer, Fares bin Muhammad, the ruler of the Banu Khalid, lived in Al-Dafi, which was 6 kilometers from the western edge of Abu Ali Island.

Description of site 

The location is a residential neighborhood with partially finished units that include water facilities, reception areas, and storage areas. It appears that the dwelling was maintained over a significant amount of time, possibly dating back to pre-Islamic and late-Islamic periods. There are numerous pieces of shattered alkaline-glazed and regular unglazed pottery scattered around the site's surface. Archaeological mounds may be seen in the area, dispersed at random. Some significant discoveries were made as a result of the test excavations at the location, including: a well-built palace. Along with several censers made of limestone, he also displayed shattered pots made of soapstone or marble that represented pieces of pots or lids. female. The preliminary comparative archaeological analysis of the ceramics found at the This suggests that the Al-Dafi site witnessed a cultural flourishing during the period of the intermediate Arab kingdoms, which is typically dated to the period confined between the third century BC and the end of the second century AD. The site revealed that they are similar to distinctive pottery types that have similar types in known sites in the east of the Arabian Peninsula. The website connects to other websites such as the Thaj website, websites in the Eastern Province south of Dhahran, the Al-Faw website in the Wadi Al-Dawasir Governorate, and the Failaka Island website in the State of Kuwait. Two thousand years ago, the location was home to the ancient city of Thaj. Its dimensions are 235 x 200 meters, and excavations there yielded the following notable finds:

 Pottery The site was notable for its abundance of pottery in a variety of sizes and shapes, as well as the discovery of 149 bags' worth of pottery fragments.
 Clay statues, often known as terracotta statues or statues of characters with hearts 
 Since the beginning of human history, beads have been worn as ornaments. The location of the beads, which are varieties of soap, alabaster, and pottery-inspired stone beads, reveals the site's age.
 Tools made of glass, metal, and wood were discovered, including a translucent glass shard with an odd shape, an oxidized copper rod, a little copper ring, and a fine-quality fragment of a small wooden comb.

Hellenistic architecture 
According to historian Ali Al-Durora, Al-excavations Dafi's are thought to be the most significant Hellenistic city on the eastern coast with complete architecture. He explained that her name was derived from the Greek personal name Helen, which is how the Greeks refer to themselves. It is the final phase of Greek civilization, lasting from the first millennium BC to the fifth century AD. The recently discovered Hellenistic architecture provides crucial architectural cues to the person who lived in Jubail 2,100 years ago, including the use of domes, one of the hallmarks of Hellenistic architecture, shoulders and pillars to mimic the texture of tensile lines, cylindrical vaults supported on enormous walls, and vaults and occasional vaults to protect buildings. One of the most significant characteristics of this architecture is the use of materials in accordance with their nature, so the shapes that were used in wood were not replicated. This is in addition to the strikingly wide and clear walls, the use of fine columns in the perspective of entrances and facades, the use of towers and small windows in them for protection, and the use of cavities within the wide walls. When stone was employed in place of it, as was the case in most nations' buildings, stone and wood were used in accordance with specific architectural requirements and traits.

The history of Al-Dafe site 
The Arab Mamluks enjoyed wealth between 300 BC and the end of the year 300 AD, according to the archaeological analysis of the materials found in the strata of the earth.

References 

Archaeological discoveries
Archaeology
history